Nabil Franck Assani (born January 27, 1988), known by his stage name Blaaz, is a Beninese hip hop recording artist from Kano, Nigeria.

Early life and career beginning 
At the age of eleven, Blaaz was so fascinated by music. Early in 2006 he started rap as a simple composer. But that doesn't interest his mother firstly because she doesn't want her son make career in music.

His experiences through collaborations 
He appears for the first time on the album of Fool Faya in 2007.  During the same year Blaaz appears with Cyano-gêne on the single " Hard lyrical " followed by " Alerte Rouge " which was so much successfully that Cotonou City Crew decides to work in project with him. It was a very good collaboration which never stopped increasing the artist who begins by getting noticed through the single " Ou est ma monnaie " of the group CCC. A mixtape which was moreover the most downloaded song of the times. The success of this single also brought Blaaz in 2008 with the release of the single " Aller Retour " which also was the single which announced the  release of his first album entitled Ghetto Blaazter on December 26, 2008. Better song of 2008 with the single Aller Retour making him one of several media in Benin. Blaaz is then requested everywhere in Benin and insub-region for concerts and others etc.... From 2008 until the end of year 2010 we find him in the mixtape W.A.R. Things changed with time and Blaaz travelled to Gabon to sign an agreement with the gabonese label Eben Entertainment in 2011. With  Eben , he marks his return with a 
new single " Le fou " which was the more downloaded song of the time. He is also present on the mixtape of  Eben Family 3  of the group  Eben  Entertainment  announced for 2012. With Nouvelle Donne Music, the beninese rapper signed his first single " Ne me laisse pas tomber ". He also took up his own label:  « Self-Made-Men » in the same year of 2012, what enabled him to be raised to the rank of third artist behind the group CCC the category of better artist or group of the year by the magazine U.M.A in 2013. Blaaz will make another 
success thanks to his single " Je vais vous tuer tous " which moreover marked the beginning of year 2014.

Discography

Album 
 2008 :  Ghetto Blaazter

Singles 
 2007 : Hard lyrical (feat Cyano-Gêne)
 2007 : Alerte Rouge (feat Cyano-Gêne)
 2007 : Où est ma monnaie (feat le groupe CCC)
 2008 : Aller retour
 2008 : Buddah Love
 2008 : Le temps mort
 2008 : Ghetto Life (feat Bomo & Koba)
 2008 : Wayi (feat 3 Game & Dibi Dobo)
 2008 : Tectonick
 2008 : Intronisation (feat Cyano-Gêne)
 2008 : MC’s qui débarquent (feat DAC & DRBX)
 2008 : Si le rap (feat B-syd)
 2009 : Allez Retour 2 (feat Young J)
 2009 : Je swag (feat Enigma)
 2009 : Aller Retour remix (feat Koba)
 2009 : Avec toi (feat Caren)
 2009 : Rien à perdre (feat Big Snow)
 2009 : One life (feat Amir)
 2009 :Ghetto Blaazter (feat Diamant Noir)
 2009 : 2400 (feat Alter Ego & Dibi Dobo)
 2009 : Money Maker (feat Rim-k & DAC)
 2009 : J'ai plus le temps d'aimer (feat Nasty Nesta)
 2009 : Et si (feat Jupiter)
 2010 : J'ai la dalle (feat DAC)
 2010 : Je vise la lune
 2010 : Champagne
 2010 : Number One (feat Cyano-Gêne)
 2010 : Garçon Choco  (feat 3e Monarchie)
 2010 : Alerte à la France
 2010 : Fight
 2011 : Armés jusko MIC (feat Diamant Noir)
 2011 : Connexion Cotonou Dakar Ouaga (feat Yeleen & Nix)
 2011 : On es fatigué
 2011 : sèches tes larmes (feat L.Y Styll)
 2011 :  Soirée pop champagne (feat Nasty Nesta)
 2011 : Ofe Kpami remix (feat Inox)
 2011 : Le fou
 2011 : Freshman (feat Koba)
 2011 : Fais péter le son (feat Mutant & R-man)
 2011 : Anthologie
 2011 : Number 1 (feat Bpm)
 2011 : Métisse (feat Koba)
 2012 : Dans le club (feat Double G)
 2012 : Champions (feat Nephtali & Koba )
 2012 : We won't stop (feat Koba & MD)
 2012 : Rappelez (feat Wilf Enighma)
 2012 : Je veux (feat Bpm )
 2012 : Do it easy (feat Amron)
 2012 : Tu me connais
 2012 : Haylay
 2012 : Tic Tac (feat Nephtali)
 2012 : A chaque son  (feat King's)
 2012 : Parce que je viens de loin
 2012 : Cotonou Malabo
 2012 : We go hard (feat Koba)
 2012 : Amen
 2012 : Porte bonheur (feat King's)
 2012 : Le pacte
 2013 : Ton Corps (feat Sayan)
 2013 : Sos (feat Koba )
 2013 : Last men standing (feat Enighma & Nasty Nesta )
 2013 : C'est chaud (feat 3e monarchie)
 2013 : Do it big (feat Hypnoz)
 2013 : Désolé (feat Koba)
 2013 : Your time (feat Rim-K & Anna)
 2013 : Juste s'amuser (feat Niyi)
 2013 : Evolue (feat Hypnoz)
 2013 : Alien
 2013 : Sex U (feat Sam Seed)
 2013 : Haut les mains (feat Willy Baby)
 2013 : Calmement
 2013 : Ne me laisse pas tomber
 2013 : CTN Boss (feat Rest'n, Cyano-Gene, Enighma, Mutant, Logozo, & S@m)
 2013 : Step du fou (feat 3K)
 2013 : Validé (feat BIG C )
 2014 : (Intro) (feat Salam Aleykoum)
 2014 : Donne lui
 2014 : Alicia (feat Kardio & Fanicko)
 2014 : Danse le Azonto (feat Kayno)
 2014 : Mêle-toi de ta vie (feat Bpm & Fanicko)
 2014 : Je vais vous tuer tous
 2014 : La raison de la colère  (feat Method Volkaniq)
 2014 : Gbe é ton lè (Remix) (feat Ctn Heroes)
 2014 : Repose En Paix
 2014 : Spiritual Waist (feat Mandee Marcus)
 2014 : Oh My God (feat Kardio & Niyi Kosiberu)
 2014 : Même Pas Honte (feat Fanicko)
 2014 : Jvvtt (remix) (feat Lepac)
 2014 : Frais depuis toujours (feat Double Face)
 2014 : Baby Tomato (feat Lace)

Mixtapes 
 2008 : W.A.R
  2011 : Eben Family 3
 2013 : Compte à Rebours
 2014 : Recto Verso

Tours and concerts 
 Blaaz était présent sur scène au Concert MTN HKH 2014 Festival MTN Hip Hop Kankpé 2014
 Blaaz du retour au Gabon
 CONCERT BLAAZ & SELF MADE MEN "COMPTE A REBOURS"

Notes and references

References

Beninese male singers
1988 births
Living people
Musicians from Kano